The 2017 Réunion Premier League was the 68th season of the Réunion Premier League, the professional league for association football clubs in Réunion, since the league's establishment in 1950. The season started on 14 July and concluded on 17 December 2017.

Standings
  1.JS Saint-Pierroise              26  24  2  0  68- 7 100  Champions
  2.AS Excelsior (Saint-Joseph)     26  15  7  4  51-23  78
  3.US Sainte-Marienne              26  13 10  3  41-22  75
  4.Saint-Denis FC                  26  11  5 10  38-35  64
  5.SS Jeanne d'Arc (Le Port)       26  10  5 11  31-26  61
  6.OSCA Léopards (Saint-André)     26   8  8 10  32-35  58
  7.AS Marsouins (Saint-Leu)        26   8  7 11  26-50  57
  8.SS Saint-Louisienne             26   8  6 12  27-34  56  [4 2 1 1 5-4 11]
  9.AS MJC Sainte-Suzanne           26   8  6 12  23-32  56  [4 2 1 1 4-3 11]
 10.AJ Petite-Ile                   26   9  3 14  32-39  56  [4 1 0 3 4-6  7]
 11.Saint-Pauloise FC               26   9  2 15  33-44  55
 ----------------------------------------------------------
 12.SDEFA (Saint-Denis)             26   6  8 12  22-42  52  [4 3 1 0 5-1 14]  Relegation Playoff
 ----------------------------------------------------------
 13.Trois-Bassins FC                26   8  2 16  27-48  52  [4 2 0 2 4-5 10]  Relegated
 14.ASC Grands Bois (Saint-Pierre)  26   7  5 14  24-38  52  [4 0 1 3 1-4  5]  Relegated

References

Football competitions in Réunion
Premier League
Reunion